Ust-Labinsk is a town and the administrative center of Ust-Labinsky District of Krasnodar Krai, Russia.

Geography
The town is situated in the central part of Krasnodar Krai, at the confluence of the Kuban and Laba rivers, 62 km to the east of Krasnodar.

Population
Population: 39,456 (2020),

History
History of Ust-Labinsk dates back to 1778, when fort Aleksandrovskiy was founded at the confluence of Kuban and Laba rivers. The construction was finished in 1793, under the direction of general Ivan Gudovich.
In 1794 stanitsa Ust-Labinskaya was established by the resettled Don Cossacks. On May 28, 1958, it was granted town status and renamed.

Two Heroes of the Soviet Union (Alexander Geraskin and Ivan Ivaschenko) were born in Ust-Labinsk, as well as soviet engineer Nikolay Popov (the chief designer of the T-80 tank), and football player Anton Vlasov. The 'Pioneer Hero' Abram Pinkenson was shot by the Nazis in the town in 1942. Russian billionaire Oleg Deripaska grew up in the town.

Administrative and municipal status
Within the framework of administrative divisions, Ust-Labinsk serves as the administrative center of Ust-Labinsky District. As an administrative division, it is, together with two rural localities, incorporated within Ust-Labinsky District as the Town of Ust-Labinsk. As a municipal division, the territory of Ust-Labinsk is incorporated within Ust-Labinsky Municipal District as Ust-Labinskoye Urban Settlement. The two rural localities are incorporated separately: the settlement of Dvubratsky is incorporated as Dvubratskoye Rural Settlement, while the khutor of Oktyabrsky is a part of Zheleznoye Rural Settlement, both of Ust-Labinsky Municipal District.

References

Notes

Sources

External links
Official website of Ust-Labinsk 
Wiki of Ust-Labinsk 

Cities and towns in Krasnodar Krai
Populated places established in 1794
1794 establishments in the Russian Empire